Patrick Lennon (1923 – 8 September 1990), known as Pádraig Lennon, was an Irish hurler who played for club side Éire Óg and at inter-county level with the Kilkenny senior hurling team. He usually lined out as a corner-forward.

Career

Lennon played hurling as a schoolboy with the Kilkenny CBS team, while simultaneously lining out at juvenile and underage levels with the Éire Óg club. He progressed onto the club's senior team and won three Kilkenny SHC titles between 1944 and 1947. Lennon first appeared on the inter-county scene when he earned a call-up to the Kilkenny senior hurling team during the 1946-47 National Hurling League. He was a non-playing substitute, alongside his brother-in-law Jim Langton, in the defeat of Cork in the 1947 All-Ireland final. Lennon spent much of his later years working as a coach and selector at all levels with the Clara club.

Death

Lennon died on 8 September 1990 after taking ill at a Clara juvenile hurling game at Mosney Holiday Camp.

Honours

Éire Óg
Kilkenny Senior Hurling Championship: 1944, 1945, 1947

Kilkenny
All-Ireland Senior Hurling Championship: 1947
Leinster Senior Hurling Championship: 1947

References

1923 births
1990 deaths
Éire Óg (Kilkenny) hurlers
Kilkenny inter-county hurlers
Hurling coaches
Hurling selectors